Sydney Thompson was a BBC bandleader of the 1950s. His "Old-Tyme Dance Orchestra" was one of the leading UK bands of the period.

References

Big band bandleaders
Year of birth missing
Place of birth missing